The Esperance Branch Railway is a railway from Kalgoorlie to the port of Esperance in Western Australia.

It was lobbied for by Esperance residents to be linked into the WAGR railway network to provide land transport to their region.

In the strictest terms it was an extension of the Eastern Goldfields Railway.
, but following the Standard Gauge project in the 1960s it ran from Kalgoorlie to Esperance, as Coolgardie was no longer connected by rail.

Sub-divisions/Sections
 Coolgardie – Widgiemooltha  – , completed in 1908.
 Widgiemooltha – Norseman  –  , completed in 1909
 Norseman – Salmon Gums  – , completed in 1927
 Salmon Gums – Esperance  – , completed in 1925.

Steam era water supplies
During the time the narrow gauge railway was in operation, due to the distances through dry country, dams and tanks were of importance to supply the steam engines in operation.  Between Coolgardie and Esperance, water supply sources were from Water Supply Department (Coolgardie), Mines Department Dam (Widgiemooltha),and WAGR dams – WAGR annual reports took into consideration: Catchment area, Capacity, Pumped or gravitation collection of water, estimated loss by evaporation and absorption, and total amount of water stored.

Esperance Flyer 
This passenger train started in 1932. Trains were sped up by a further 1½ hours when diesels took over in 1954. By 1967 a bus had replaced the train.

Gauge and route 
It was originally built as narrow gauge, but with gauge standardisation of the main interstate railway in the late 1960s, it was converted to standard gauge to, so as not to become a gauge orphan.  The route was also changed somewhat with standardisation, with a junction at Kalgoorlie replacing the junction at Coolgardie.

Selected stopping locations 
 Grass Patch
 Scaddan
 Gibson – 1800m crossing loop built 2009.
 Esperance

Notes

Further reading

 
 Quinlan, Howard & Newland, John R. (2000) Australian Railway Routes 1854-2000

External links 
Old photos – Esperance station, Esperance Flyer

Railway lines in Western Australia
Goldfields-Esperance
Standard gauge railways in Australia